Hermeuptychia cucullina is a species of butterfly in the family Nymphalidae. It was described by Gustav Weymer in 1911. It is found in Bolivia.

References

Butterflies described in 1911
Euptychiina